Celestial Lineage is the fourth full-length studio album by American black metal band Wolves in the Throne Room. It was released through Southern Lord Records on September 13, 2011.

On August 9, 2011, "Woodland Cathedral" was posted for streaming on National Public Radio.

Production
Celestial Lineage was the last album recorded at Randall Dunn's Aleph Studio.

Critical reception

Music critic Brandon Stosuy described Celestial Lineage as "American black metal's idiosyncratic defining record of 2011".

Track listing

Personnel
Sourced from AllMusic's credits.

Wolves in the Throne Room
 Nathan Weaver - vocals, guitar, synthesizer, field recording
 Aaron Weaver - drums, guitar, percussion, field recording
 Jessika Kenney - sung vocals, choir/chorus, organ; composer, lyricist; arranger, vocal arrangement

References

External links
 Wolves in the Throne Room official website
 Southern Lord Records

2011 albums
Wolves in the Throne Room albums
Southern Lord Records albums
Albums produced by Randall Dunn